The CBS Broadcast Center is a television and radio production facility located in New York City. It is CBS's main East Coast production hub, similar to CBS Studio Center in Los Angeles as the West Coast hub. The Broadcast Center is one of two production facilities in Manhattan owned by Paramount Global, the other being the studios for MTV located in the company's headquarters at One Astor Plaza.

Description
The nearly block-long facility at 524 West 57th Street in the Hell's Kitchen section of Manhattan serves as the headquarters of CBS News and the CBSN live streaming news channel, and is the main broadcast facility for CBS News, CBS Sports, New York City flagship O&O station WCBS-TV and CBS-owned independent station WLNY. In 2001, BET previously used studios for 106 & Park and other in-studio shows (both BET and CBS were part of Viacom until their 2006 separation by the Viacom/CBS split, but re-merged in 2019). CBS Media Ventures's nationally syndicated newsmagazine Inside Edition is also taped at the Broadcast Center.

The Broadcast Center is also the production base for CBS News Radio. The network's Master Control (aka Central Control) on the first floor also serves as the routing center for other programming distributed by Westwood One (formerly Dial Global). The radio network's flagship station WCBS (AM) was housed in the Broadcast Center from 2000 (moving from Black Rock, CBS's corporate headquarters at 51 West 52nd Street) until 2011 when it relocated to 345 Hudson Street in lower Manhattan, billed on-air as "The Audacy Hudson Square Broadcast Center."

In addition to the Broadcast Center, CBS has one other major studio in Manhattan — the Ed Sullivan Theater (CBS-TV Studio 50) at 1697 Broadway, the home of The Late Show with Stephen Colbert. The General Motors Building (CBS-TV Studio 58), on Fifth Avenue and 58th Street, was the home of The Early Show until December 31, 2011. The Early Shows successor, the second incarnation of CBS This Morning (predecessor of CBS Mornings), premiered from newly constructed Studio 57 at the Broadcast Center on January 9, 2012.

The CBS Evening News moved into Studio 57 from Studio 47 (previously sharing space with the CBS News newsroom) in December 2016. It relocated from New York in December 2019, as new anchor Norah O'Donnell will be based in Washington, D.C. ViacomCBS announced in May 2021 that CBS This Morning would vacate the Broadcast Center for the MTV Studios. The move was completed on September 7, 2021, when CBS This Morning rebranded to CBS Mornings.

History

Early history
The Center opened as the CBS Production Center in the late 1950s, when the network's master control, film and videotape facilities, and four studios were located in the Grand Central Terminal building.

The building in which the Broadcast Center is located formerly served as a dairy depot for Sheffield Farms. CBS purchased the site in 1952 and began using it regularly for TV in 1963. The radio network, with offices at 1 East 53rd Street and studios at 49 East 52nd Street, near the old CBS corporate headquarters at 485 Madison Avenue, moved to the Broadcast Center in July 1964, while the television network's master control moved from Grand Central to the Broadcast Center in late 1964. The company spent $14.5 million to create what was, at the time, "the largest 'self-contained' radio and television production center in the United States and the most modern broadcasting plant of its kind in the world," as the New York Tribune put it in 1961.

From the 1950s to 1970s, another prominent CBS stage in New York was Studio 52 (now the disco-theater Studio 54) at 254 West 54th Street, around the corner from Studio 50. CBS also leased the Himan Brown studios at 221 West 26th Street, now Chelsea Studios, for several shows in the 1960s, 1970s, and 1980s.

CBS Broadcast Center and soap operas
Until January 2000, the Broadcast Center was home to CBS-TV's soap opera As the World Turns, which moved to JC Studios in Brooklyn. Former serials Love of Life, Search for Tomorrow, The Edge Of Night      before moving to ABC in December of  1975     Love is a Many Splendored Thing, Secret Storm, and Where the Heart Is were also produced at the Broadcast Center.

After a 37-year absence, Guiding Light returned to the Broadcast Center in September 2005, after 17 years at EUE/Screen Gems studios, 222 East 44th Street and 20 years at the CBS/Himan Brown studios at 221 West 26th Street. The show had been produced in Studio 45 at the CBS Broadcast Center from 1965 to 1968 before moving to West 26th Street. GL used Studios 42 and 45 until its final broadcast on September 18, 2009.

"From the ABC Broadcast Center..."
In 1996, Brillstein-Grey Entertainment produced The Dana Carvey Show at the Broadcast Center for ABC. As a jab at CBS (ABC's competition), the show's opening credits had a man with a paper version of the ABC logo on a ladder outside of the Broadcast Center covering over the CBS Eye logo while the announcer proclaimed "From the ABC Broadcast Center...".

Recent history
In early 2012, it was announced The Nate Berkus Show would not be renewed. After a few months it was announced that Anderson Cooper's talk show would move into Studio 42 leaving its home in the Time Warner Center.

Also in 2012, CBS acquired the Riverhead, Long Island-licensed WLNY-TV (Channel 55, cable channel 10), setting up a duopoly with WCBS-TV. Following the merger, CBS moved that station's employees to the CBS Broadcast Center, with their former Melville facility maintained as the WCBS/WLNY Long Island bureau offices. WLNY currently carries one program from Broadcast Center: a 9pm newscast with WCBS's news personnel from Broadcast Center. Live from the Couch, a morning show airing parallel to CBS This Morning on WCBS, was broadcast on WLNY from 2012 until early 2014, when it was canceled due to low ratings.

HBO satire show Last Week Tonight with John Oliver, Showtime talk show Desus & Mero a are also recorded at the Broadcast Center. TBS news satire show Full Frontal with Samantha Bee recorded from the Broadcast Center from its 2016 premiere until the pandemic, before moving to home taping for several months. After that, the latter show moved to Connecticut and a smaller studio without an audience.

On March 12, 2020, one day after COVID-19 was declared a pandemic, the CBS Broadcast Center was closed for disinfection after two employees tested positive for COVID-19. Production of WCBS newscasts was assumed by KCBS-TV, while CBS This Morning was moved to CBS News's Washington studio (used for the CBS Evening News since December). The Broadcast Center reopened on a limited basis on March 14, 2020, starting with the Saturday edition of CBS This Morning from Studio 57; on March 18, ViacomCBS announced that its operations would again temporarily relocate from the Broadcast Center, with CBS This Morning moving to the set of The Late Show with Stephen Colbert at the Ed Sullivan Theater and KCBS-TV again producing WCBS-TV's newscasts. From March 20, WCBS-TV newscasts were presented from the studios of New York Yankees and Brooklyn Nets broadcaster YES Network in Stamford, Connecticut, before moving back again to the Broadcast Center, beginning on April 17 with the morning newscast. On the June 21, 2020 broadcast of 60 in 6, Seth Doane partially covered the Broadcast Center's exposure to COVID-19 in a piece titled CBS News Battles COVID-19. The piece mentions that CBS News flew in staffers, including those located in Seattle and Rome in early March 2020 to begin filming promotional material for 60 in 6, which brought COVID-19 positive individuals in close contact with CBS employees which resulted in the shutdown of the CBS Broadcast Center.

Studios
33: 60 Minutes, former home of The CBS Evening News with Walter Cronkite
41: The Drew Barrymore Show
42: Last Week Tonight with John Oliver / Real Sports with Bryant Gumbel
43: CBS Sports / CBS Sports Network (CBS co-productions of NCAA March Madness coverage with Turner Sports)
44: CBS Sports Network
45: CBS Sports (mostly Paramount+) / Inside Edition
46: WCBS-TV & WLNY
47: CBS Weekend News (Sunday)
57: CBS News Streaming Network and CBS Morning News
57 Newsroom: CBS News Streaming Network

References 

Broadcast Center
Recording studios in Manhattan
Hell's Kitchen, Manhattan
Mass media company headquarters in the United States
Television studios in the United States
Entertainment companies based in New York City
Grand Central Terminal
Hudson Square
57th Street (Manhattan)